Nate Henricks (born March 4, 1987) is a songwriter, producer, and visual artist from Peoria, IL.  Henricks's work has received critical attention for its 'internet generation collage style' and for his alignment with the underground lofi movement of the 2000s.  A number of his albums have been released on various small-run tape labels across the United States.  Henricks has also been recognized for his unconventional approach to website design, music video composition, digital art, and painting.

Discography 
 We Make Low Art (2007)
 Music Makes Me Crash My Car (2009)
 24 Mins. (2011)
 Jackdaws Love My Big Sphinx of Quartz (2011)
 Horse Carrot/Lemonade Guarantee (2011)
 Hang Out/Lay Low Top Grossing Films of 1984 split (2012) Released on cassette by Eat Tapes
 Prehistoric Candybar (2012) Released on cassette by Sunup Recordings
 Nth Meridian (2012)
 Close Encounters with Green Magic (2012) Released on cassette by Patient Sounds Intl.
 Horseradish (2013) Released on cassette by Patient Sounds Intl.
 Warp Time the Zoom Goon's Kookamunga (2013)
 Sleetmute (2014)
 Neon For No One (2014) Released on cassette by Crash Symbols
 Apple Juice (2014)
 Quest for the Obsolete Egg (2014)
 How I Got Nanoscopic (2015) Released on cassette by Truly Bald
 Crown Leaf Chorus (2016) Released on cassette by Patient Sounds Intl.
 wildness, ed. wildness (2022)

References

External links 
 http://natehenricksmusic.bandcamp.com
 https://vimeo.com/user19626850

Living people
Songwriters from Illinois
Record producers from Illinois
1987 births
Musicians from Peoria, Illinois